Manorhamilton is the second-largest town in County Leitrim, Ireland.

History 
Before the Plantations of Ireland, the settlement was known, and continues to be known in the Irish language, as Cluainín or Cluainín Uí Ruairc (meaning "little meadow of O'Rourke"). This lay on the west bank of the Owenbeg. Uí Ruairc (anglicised as O'Rourke) was the local Gaelic chieftain, based in nearby Dromahair, whose land was seized by the British and then granted to Sir Frederick Hamilton for his services in the European wars of the 17th century. As a result of his actions, Hamilton to this day is considered to have been a tyrant by the local people. He began building a new town on the east bank of the river, in the townland of Clonmullen, which he renamed 'Manorhamilton'. After the town emerged, the name Baile Hamaltuin was adopted by Irish speakers and its anglicised form 'Ballyhamilton' was for a time used by English speakers.

Manorhamilton Castle
Manorhamilton castle was erected in 1634 by Sir Frederick Hamilton, who had been granted land in north Leitrim by the British government. The land had been confiscated from the O'Rourkes, the ruling clan of Breifne. Hamilton was a very unpopular overlord and faced frequent native rebellion before the Castle was burned by the Earls of Clanrickard (Burkes) in 1652. The castle ruin has been renovated as a tourist attraction.

Economy and culture

Manorhamilton acts as a retail and services catchment for the surrounding rural area. Manorhamilton is also home to several manufacturing businesses, including manufacturers of rubber, plastics, automotive and other products.

Throughout at least the 19th and 20th centuries, a number of annual fairs were held at Manorhamilton on 8 May, 1 July, 7 October and 18 November, with four annual fairs held at nearby Lurganboy on 15 (or 17) May, 21 June, 21 August, 23 September and 21 October.

Farming is still a dominant sector, yet traditional industries and livelihoods are being replaced by new forms of economic activity.

Manorhamilton has several pubs, with many hosting traditional Irish music sessions.

Places of interest

Manorhamilton Castle & Heritage Centre 

The ruins of Manorhamilton Castle have been renovated and now house a heritage centre and a permanent exhibition, with guided tours of the castle ruins and grounds.

Bee Park Resource Centre 
The Bee Park Resource Centre is a facility on the site of the former community centre. The centre has a large main hall which stages concerts and community events. The Bee Park Centre is also used by youth, sport, disability and childcare groups. The North Leitrim Women's Group and The North Leitrim Men's Group are also located here.

Square 
A public square has been developed adjacent to Manorhamilton Castle on the former fair green. The square, which incorporates an outdoor performance platform, features an abstract sculpture, sourced from the local Leitrim Sculpture Centre.

Famine graveyard 
This plot is one of three graveyards opened shortly before and during the Great Famine of 1845 - 1849.

Megalithic sites 
The north Leitrim area features a number of pre-historic sites of interest. This includes the nearby O'Donnell's Rock plateau, where several well-preserved stone forts and passage tombs are located. Cairns and other tombs are also visible on Benbo Mountain and at the summits of surrounding mountains. On lower ground, the remains of ringforts and cashels, tombs and other structures are dotted throughout the landscape.

Healthcare 

Our Lady's Hospital is located on the edge of the town. This HSE hospital provides a range of services, and is focused on long-stay and day-care geriatric and rheumatology services.

Transport

Road 
Manorhamilton is on the N16 national primary route. This road continues across the border and becomes the A4.
The R280 road links the town to Bundoran in County Donegal and to Carrick-on-Shannon in County Leitrim. The R282 road links the town to Rossinver and continues across the border as the B53 to Garrison, County Fermanagh.

The town is served by a number of Bus Éireann routes. The only daily service is route 458 which runs from Ballina to Enniskillen. Route 470 (serving Dromahair) and route 495 (to Ballyshannon) both run on Fridays.

Rail
The nearest railway station to Manorhamilton is Sligo, which is served by trains to Dublin Connolly and is operated by Iarnród Éireann. Bus Éireann services from Manorhamilton stop at Sligo bus station, which is beside Sligo railway station.

Manorhamilton previously had its own station, Manorhamilton railway station, which opened in 1880 and formed part of the Sligo, Leitrim and Northern Counties Railway (SLNCR). All maintenance on the line's engines and rolling stock was carried out at the station works, and the railway became a major employer locally. The administrative headquarters of the SLNCR was located in the nearby village of Lurganboy. The railway served as a major business and tourism artery to the area and developed a large trade in livestock exports. The SLNCR, and with it Manorhamilton station, closed on 1 October 1957.

Sport 
The local Gaelic football and hurling club is Glencar–Manorhamilton GAA (Gleann an Chairthe–Cluainín). The club has won the Leitrim Senior Football Championship on several occasions, including in 2019. The club's grounds are in Boggaun.

The association football (soccer) club, Manorhamilton Rangers AFC, participates in the Sligo Leitrim Junior soccer leagues. Manor Rangers pitch is located in the Bee Park sports grounds in the centre of the town.

Manorhamilton Tennis Club has all-weather courts in the Bee Park sports grounds. Teams from the club also participate in the Connacht Tennis League.

Other local sports clubs include a boxing club (Sean McDermott Boxing Club), hillwalking club (Holey Soles Hillwalking Club), and others involved in fishing, athletics, basketball, Irish dancing, table tennis and badminton.

Media 
Local media organisations include the Leitrim Observer newspaper, and the town and its hinterland is covered by Ocean FM radio station, which had a studio in Manorhamilton until 2017.

See also 
List of towns and villages in Ireland

Notable people 
 John Willoughby Crawford QC (1817–1875), Lieutenant-Governor of Ontario (1873–75).
 Charles Irwin VC (1824–1873),  Irish recipient of the Victoria Cross.
 Gordon Wilson (1927–1995), peace campaigner.

References

Primary sources

Secondary sources

External link

 
Towns and villages in County Leitrim